Rebecca Kelly Slaughter (born c. 1983) is an American attorney who is a current commissioner of the Federal Trade Commission. Slaughter was previously the acting chair of the Federal Trade Commission from January 21, 2021, to June 15, 2021.

Biography 
Slaughter was a longtime policy counsel to Sen. Chuck Schumer of New York before accepting the appointment to a Democratic seat on the Federal Trade Commission in 2018, during the presidency of Donald Trump. In this capacity, she filled the seat left vacant by Edith Ramirez. 

Slaughter was nominated by President Joe Biden for a second term as commissioner on February 13, 2023.

Shortly after her appointment to the seat, Slaughter gave birth to her third child, making her the first person to give birth while serving on the FTC. Slaughter was considered for the role of permanent agency chair under President Biden, but the position instead went to Lina Khan.

Slaughter was an associate in the D.C. office of Sidley Austin LLP before entering federal service.

Personal life 
Slaughter received her B.A. in Anthropology magna cum laude from Yale University and her J.D. from Yale Law School, where she served as an editor on the Yale Law Journal. She lives in Maryland with her husband, Justin Slaughter. They have four children.

References

Living people
Federal Trade Commission personnel
1980s births
People associated with Sidley Austin
American lawyers